Suprême NTM is the fourth album of the French hip hop group Suprême NTM.

Track listing
 "Intro" (Madizm / Kool Shen) - 1:13
 "Back dans les bacs" (Kool Shen / Sec.Undo / LG Experience / Joey Starr) - 3:17
 "Laisse pas traîner ton fils" (Sulee B Wax / Joey Starr / Kool Shen) - 3:57
 "That's my People" (NTM / Sully Sefil / Kool Shen) - 4:11
 "Seine-Saint-Denis Style" (Daddy Jokno / Joey Starr / Kool Shen) - 3:20
 "Interlude" (Kool Shen / Joey Starr) - 0:31
 "Ma B*nz" with Lord Kossity (DJ Spank / Lord Kossity / Joey Starr / Kool Shen) - 4:06
 "C'est arrivé près d'chez toi"  with Jahyze (DJ Spank / Jahyze / Joey Starr / Kool Shen) - 4:01
 "On est encore là (I)" (Sec.Undo / Joey Starr / Kool Shen) - 3:39
 "Odeurs de soufre" (DJ Spank / Jahyze / Joey Starr / Kool Shen) - 4:28
 "Je vise juste" (DJ Spank / Jahyze / Joey Starr / Kool Shen) - 3:13
 "Pose ton gun" (Joey Starr / Kool Shen / Willie Gunz) - 3:39
 "Respire" (Madizm / Joey Starr / Kool Shen) - 3:40
 "On est encore là (II)" (Zoxeakopat / Joey Starr / Kool Shen) - 3:57
 "Hardcore sur le beat, freestyle" (LG Experience / Mass / Busta Flex / Joey Starr / Kool Shen) - 4:41
 "Outro" (Willie Gunz / Joey Starr / Kool Shen) - 2:28

Samples
"That's my People"
"Prelude in E Minor, Op. 28, No. 4" composed by Frédéric Chopin
"Intro" de l'album Enigma by Keith Murray(sample vocal)
"What The Blood Clot" by Method Man (sample vocal)
"Seine-Saint-Denis Style"
"That's Where The Happy People Go" by The Trammps
"C'est arrivé près d'chez toi"
"Lyphard Melodie" by Richard Clayderman
On est encore là
"The Long Wait" by Morton Stevens
"Odeurs de soufre"
"Dwyck" by GangStarr
"Pose ton gun"
"And I Love Her" by Bobby Womack

Charts

Weekly charts

Year-end charts

References

1998 albums
Suprême NTM albums